Armenian commercial capital played a significant role in international trade in the 17th and 18th centuries. The merchants were engaged in lively commercial activity in Russia, Tbilisi, Baku, Persia, Turkey, India, and in European countries.

Writings
Mercantilism in Armenian reality was expressed by individual authors, who wrote works which have not become part of a state policy system, because the activity is mainly focused on the commercial bourgeoisie of foreign countries.

Famous merchants

Zakaria Agulleci
In the 17th century one of Armenia's famous merchants was Zakaria Agulleci (1630–1691), who presented a level of wholesale and retail prices in different countries and information about a system of coin issue.

Shahamir Sahamiryan
Another who played a significant role was Shahamir Sahamiryan (1723-1797). He commented on protectionist policies and high taxes.

References

 Authors: G. Kirakosyan, M. Tavadyan, S. Grigoryan - Economics 2004

Early Modern history of Armenia
Economic history of Armenia
Mercantilism
History of globalization
17th-century merchants
18th-century merchants
Armenian businesspeople by industry
Trade in the Ottoman Empire